The KOD-1 was an Estonian-designed Latvian trainer aircraft built by Liepājas Kara Ostas Darbnīcas (Liepāja military manufacturing). The KOD-1 was built from 1936 until 1938 and was used as a trainer by the Latvian Aeroclub and the Aizsargi home guard.

Design and operational history 
In the 1930s, the Estonian designers Voldemar Post, Otto Org and Roman Neudorf (later changed his name to Rein Tooma) had constructed PON-1 trainer in Estonia. They gave the production license also to Latvia. Production started in 1935 in the Liepāja military workshops under name KOD-1. The airplane was designed as a one or two-seater biplane. The first flight of KOD-1 was in January 1936 when it was flown from Liepāja to Spilve airport, Riga. In March the first four airplanes were deployed to the Aizsargi aviation unit. The airplanes were actively used for training purposes as well as for demonstration flights in the Baltics and Finland.
In total at least nine planes were built. After the Occupation of Latvia by the Soviet Union in 1940 the KOD-1 was not used and several examples were destroyed. In 1941 there was only one airworthy KOD-1 at the Gulbene airport. After the start of Operation Barbarossa, the airport was evacuated to the Soviet Union in early July. The last KOD-1 crashed during takeoff from Gulbene.

Specifications 

The first models of the KOD-1 had Armstrong Siddeley Genet Major I five-cylinder radial engines, but due to constant overheating and compression problems they were replaced with de Havilland Gipsy Major engines from 1937.

References

Bibliography
 Gerdessen, Frederik. "Estonian Air Power 1918 – 1945". Air Enthusiast, No. 18, April – July 1982. pp. 61–76. .

External links 
 latvianaviation.com
 www.airwar.ru

1930s Latvian military trainer aircraft